Patrick Vincent "Paddy" Stokes (15 August 1884 – 6 April 1945) was an Australian politician.

He was born at Braidwood to farmer Patrick Stokes and Bridget, née Daly. He was educated locally before becoming an engine driver, qualifying in 1908. In that year he was also secretary of the Braidwood branch of the Federated Engine Drivers and Firemen's Association. He served on Sydney City Council from 1918 to 1927 and from 1934 to 1945, with a period from 1925 to 1926 as Lord Mayor. In 1925 he was elected as one of the Labor members for Goulburn in the New South Wales Legislative Assembly, and from May to October 1927 he served as Minister for Agriculture. He was defeated in the 1927 election and became a hotelkeeper, running Foster's Hotel in Sydney from 1929 to 1933, the Family Hotel in Bega from 1934 to 1935, and Victoria Hotel in Canowindra thereafter.

His funeral was conducted at St Mary's Cathedral and he was later buried at Rookwood Catholic Cemetery on 7 April 1945.

References

 

1884 births
1945 deaths
Australian Labor Party mayors
Members of the New South Wales Legislative Assembly
Mayors and Lord Mayors of Sydney
Sydney City Councillors
Australian Labor Party members of the Parliament of New South Wales
20th-century Australian politicians